The phrase Jesuit missions usually refers to a Jesuit missionary enterprise in a particular area, involving a large number of Jesuit priests and brothers, and lasting over a long period of time.

List of some Jesuit missions   
Circular Mission of Chiloé Archipelago
Jesuit missions among the Guaraní
Jesuit Missions of Chiquitos
Jesuit Missions in China
Jesuit Missions in North America
Jesuit Missions amongst the Huron
History of Roman Catholicism in Belize
Jesuit Missions in Northern Sonora and Southern Arizona

See also
 Jesuit Missions UK, a charity based out of Wimbledon, England.

References